Gregory Breit (Grigory Alfredovich Breit-Shneider; July 14, 1899, Mykolaiv, Kherson Governorate – September 13, 1981, Salem, Oregon) was a Russian-born  Jewish American physicist and professor at New York University (1929–1934), University of Wisconsin–Madison (1934–1947), Yale University (1947–1968), and University at Buffalo (1968–1973). In 1921, he was Paul Ehrenfest's assistant in Leiden University.

Biography
After completing his Ph.D. at age 22, he was from 1923 to 1924 an assistant professor at the University of Minnesota. In 1925, while at the Carnegie Institution of Washington, Breit joined with Merle Tuve in using a pulsed radio transmitter to determine the height of the ionosphere, a technique important later in radar development.

Together with Eugene Wigner, Breit gave a description of particle resonant states with the relativistic Breit–Wigner distribution in 1929, and with Edward Condon, he first described proton-proton dispersion. He is also credited with deriving the Breit equation. The Breit frame of reference is named after him. He was one of the first to notice the zitterbewegung (jittery motion) in the solutions of the Dirac equation.

In 1934, together with John A. Wheeler, Breit described the Breit–Wheeler process. In 1939 he was elected to the National Academy of Sciences. In April 1940, he proposed to the National Research Council that American scientists observe a policy of self-censorship due to the possibility of their work being used for military purposes by enemy powers in World War II.

During the early stages of the war, Breit was chosen by Arthur Compton to supervise the early design of the first atomic bomb during an early phase in what would later become the Manhattan Project. Breit resigned his position in 1942, feeling that the work was going too slowly and that there had been security breaches on the project; his job went to Robert Oppenheimer, who was later appointed to scientific director of the entire project.

In 2014, experimentalists proposed a way to validate an idea by Breit and John A. Wheeler that matter formation could be achieved by interacting light particles ("Breit–Wheeler process").
 
Breit was Associate Editor of the Physical Review four times (1927-1929, 1939-1941, 1954-1956, and 1961-1963).

He was elected in 1923 a Fellow of the American Physical Society. He was awarded the Franklin Medal in 1964. In 1967, he was awarded the National Medal of Science.

References

External links
Annotated Bibliography for Gregory Breit from the Alsos Digital Library for Nuclear Issues
Oral history interview with Gregory Breit on 8 December 1975, American Institute of Physics, Niels Bohr Library & Archives
Biographical Memoirs of Gregory Breit by McAllister Hull
National Academy of Sciences Biographical Memoir

 Gregory Breit Papers (MS 1465). Manuscripts and Archives, Yale University Library.

1899 births
1981 deaths
Jewish physicists
20th-century American physicists
American nuclear physicists
Johns Hopkins University alumni
Manhattan Project people
University at Buffalo faculty
University of Wisconsin–Madison faculty
Yale University faculty
National Medal of Science laureates
Jewish American scientists
Fellows of the American Physical Society
20th-century American Jews
Emigrants from the Russian Empire to the United States